Doliolum is a genus of tunicates, the members of which move via jet propulsion.

Species
The World Register of Marine Species lists the following species:
Doliolum denticulatum Quoy & Gaimard, 1834
Doliolum intermedium Neumann, 1906
Doliolum nationalis Borgert, 1894

References

Thaliacea
Tunicate genera